Plérin (Gallo: Plérein) is a coastal commune in the Côtes-d'Armor department of Brittany in northwestern France. The Marché du Porc Breton, located in Plérin,  is where the price of pork is set for retailers across France.

Population

Inhabitants of Plérin are called plérinais in French.

See also
Communes of the Côtes-d'Armor department
Élie Le Goff Sculptor of Plérin's war memorial

References

External links

Official website 

Communes of Côtes-d'Armor